The 2020–21 First Football League of Kosovo season is the 22nd season of second-tier football in Kosovo. The season began on 18 September 2020 and will end on May or June 2021. A total of 20 teams are competing in the league: 18 teams from the 2019–20 season and two teams from the 2019–20 Third Football League of Kosovo.

Teams
20 teams will compete in the league – the 18 teams from the previous season and the two teams promoted from the 2019–20 Third Football League of Kosovo. The promoted teams are Kika and A&N.

Stadiums and locations

Note: Table lists in alphabetical order.

League table

Group A
<onlyinclude>

Group B
<onlyinclude>

Qualification to promotion play-offs

Semi-final

Final

Notes and references

Notes

References

External links
 

Kosovo
First League